The Mumbai Chhatrapati Shivaji Maharaj Terminus–Mangalore Junction Superfast Express is a Superfast train of the Indian Railways runs between Chhatrapati Shivaji Maharaj Terminus Mumbai in Maharashtra and Mangalore Junction of Karnataka. It is currently being operated with 12133/12134 train numbers on daily basis.

Background 

Service 

The 12133/ Mumbai CSMT–Mangaluru Junction Superfast Express is the fastest daily express train connecting Mangaluru to Mumbai in Konkan Railway. The 12133/ Mumbai CSMT–Mangaluru Junction SF Express has an average speed of 62 km/hr and covers 894 km in 14hrs30mins 12134/Mangaluru Junction–Mumbai CSMT SF Express has an average speed of 62 km/hr and 894 km in 14hrs30mins. However, during monsoons the average speed is restricted to 52 km/hr.

Route and halts 

The important halts of the train are:

 
 
 
 
 
  (temporarily for six months w.e.f. 28 January 2019 – extended by another 6 months till 28 January 2020)

Coach composition 

The train has standard ICF rakes with max speed of 110 kmph. The train consists of 17 coaches:

 1 AC II Tier
 1 AC II Tier cum AC III Tier coach
 6 AC III Tier (2 extra temporary)
 7 Sleeper coaches
 2 General
 2 Second-class Luggage/parcel van

Traction 

It is hauled by a Kalyan Loco Shed based WAP-7 electric locomotive from end to end.

See also 

 Konkan Railway
 Matsyagandha Express

Notes

External links 

 12133/Mumbai CST–Mangaluru Junction SF Express India Rail Info
 12134/Mangaluru Junction–Mumbai CST SF Express India Rail Info

References 

Transport in Mangalore
Transport in Mumbai
Express trains in India
Rail transport in Maharashtra
Rail transport in Goa
Rail transport in Karnataka
Railway services introduced in 2009
Konkan Railway